Chaetokarnyia is a genus of thrips in the family Phlaeothripidae.

Species
 Chaetokarnyia elegantulus
 Chaetokarnyia eugeniinus
 Chaetokarnyia macromma
 Chaetokarnyia tenuicornis

References

Phlaeothripidae
Thrips genera